Aqajan Mahalleh (also Romanized as Āqājān Maḩalleh) is a village in Khoshabar Rural District, in the Central District of Rezvanshahr County, Gilan Province, Iran. At the 2006 census, its population was 65, in 18 families.

References 

Populated places in Rezvanshahr County